The 1987 Yokohama/Bob Jane T-Marts 300 was an endurance race for Group A touring cars held at the Calder Park Raceway in Melbourne, Australia on the rarely used combined circuit which incorporated both the recently redeveloped road course and the newly completed NASCAR-style “Thunderdome” oval. The combined oval/road course was 4.216 km (2.620 mi) long and the race was run over 70 laps.

The race took place on 9 August 1987.

The race, which attracted 20 starters and was the first ever run on the combined road course / oval circuit, was won by the Peter Jackson Nissan Racing turbo Skyline DR30 RS of John Bowe and Terry Sheil. For Bowe, the 1984 and 1985 CAMS Gold Star winner and the 1986 Australian Sports Car Champion, it was his first touring car victory after coming close numerous times in the 1986 Australian Touring Car Championship in the Volvo Dealer Teams Volvo 240T. Bowe started the race in the Nissan and later joined the Channel 7 commentary team for the concluding stages, unashamedly cheering "You beauty" when Sheil took the lead on the last lap. The Skyline used for the event was actually the team's spare car that had rarely seen any racing and in fact had spent the majority of its time as a static display car in various shopping centres throughout the country. Second was Larry Perkins and Canberra's Bill O'Brien in O'Brien's brand new Perkins Engineering built Holden VL Commodore SS Group A. After a tangle while lapping the New Zealand BMW M3 of Graham Lorimer which damaged the Commodore's steering, Perkins drove all but the last 2 laps of the race. The car was passed by Sheil soon after O'Brien exited the pits on the last lap through the Thunderdome and had to settle for second place. Finishing in third were Australian sprintcar stars Tony Noske and Garry Rush in Noske's ex-Perkins Holden VK Commodore SS Group A.

The race was missing some of the big names in Australian touring car racing, namely Peter Brock's Melbourne based Holden Dealer Team who now being privateers and not backed by Holden were saving money by not attending, and Dick Johnson's Brisbane based Shell team who were busy converting their 1987 ATCC Ford Sierra RS Cosworth's into the newly homologated Ford Sierra RS500 in readiness for the Castrol 500 at Sandown just over a month later as well as the all important James Hardie 1000 at Bathurst which in 1987 was a round of the World Touring Car Championship. The race was attended however by the Peter Jackson Nissan team who fronted with one car for their endurance co-drivers Bowe and Sheil, Roadways Racing with their VL Commodore for Allan Grice and wise-cracking Kiwi Graeme Crosby, while the JPS Team BMW also raced and looked likely winners until a late race mishap between Tony Longhurst and Perkins when Longhurst locked his brakes coming off the Thunderdome and hit the back of the Commodore. While Perkins was able to continue with only minor body damage, Longhurst was forced to park the black and gold BMW M3 with a broken ball joint.

The race was broadcast by Channel 7 with commentary from Mike Raymond, Neil Crompton, John Harvey and Brad Jones.

Classes
Cars competed in three classes based on engine capacity.
 Class A: Over 3001cc
 Class B: 2001-3000cc
 Class C: Up to 2000cc

Results

Statistics
 Pole Position - #2 Allan Grice - 1:45.74
 Fastest Lap - #24 Kent Baigent - 1:46.17
 Race Time - 2:09.47.41

See also
1987 Australian Touring Car season

References

Further reading
 Australian Motor Racing Yearbook, 1987/88

1987 in Australian motorsport